The Carmen IOOF Home, also known as or associated with The Carmen Home of Pentecostal Holiness Church, is an Odd Fellows building in Carmen, Oklahoma that was built in 1906.  It has served historically as institutional housing.  It was listed in the National Register of Historic Places in 1984.

It is one of four historic, surviving Odd Fellows buildings in Alfalfa County that were subject of a 1983 study.  The others are the Carmen IOOF Lodge No. 84 in Carmen, the 
Aline IOOF Lodge No. 263 in Aline, and the Cherokee IOOF Lodge No. 219 in Cherokee.

The  Oklahoma Odd Fellows Home at Checotah is another NRHP-listed Odd Fellows retirement home in the state.

References

Clubhouses on the National Register of Historic Places in Oklahoma
Buildings and structures in Alfalfa County, Oklahoma
Odd Fellows buildings in Oklahoma
National Register of Historic Places in Alfalfa County, Oklahoma